Hyletastes is a genus of mites in the family Laelapidae.

Species
 Hyletastes globulus (C.L.Koch, 1939)

References

Laelapidae